Robert "King" Moody (December 6, 1929 – February 7, 2001) was an American actor, best known for playing Shtarker in the television series Get Smart and for his portrayal as Ronald McDonald in the McDonald's commercials from 1969 to 1985.

Early life
He was born on December 6, 1929, in New York City.

Career
He played the spaceship captain in Teenagers From Outer Space and various other roles in forty movies and television episodes including Bonanza, The Bob Newhart Show, CHiPs, Combat!, The Man From U.N.C.L.E., Dragnet and Sea Hunt. He became the fifth portrayer as Ronald McDonald in 1969, he played the character for sixteen years in the McDonald's commercials until 1985.

Personal life
Moody married Rachel Rosenthal in 1960; the marriage lasted for nineteen years before they divorced in 1979. He married his second wife, Jacqueline L. Larson, in 1981, but they divorced in 1984 after three years of marriage.

Death
Moody died on February 7, 2001, in Tarzana, California at the age of 71.

Filmography

Film

Television

References

External links

1929 births
2001 deaths
American male film actors
American male television actors